Odontocorynus umbellae is a species in the weevil family.

Description 
O. umbellae either have a brown or black coloring. The rostrum of the species is heavily curved at the base, but almost straight under the apex.

Ecology 
Adults consume flowers among of which are the Common Mullein, daisies, and sunflowers. They are active from May–September.

References 

Baridinae